The Tennis Tournament at the 2005 Mediterranean Games was held in the Almería Tennis Club in Almería, Spain from June 27 to July 3.

Men's final eight

Women's final eight

References
Results

Med
T
2005
Med